Dzmitry Mikalayevich Verkhawtsow (born 10 October 1986) is a Belarusian football coach and a former international. He played as a central defender.

International career
On 10 September 2008, in only his 4th game for the national side, Verkhawtsow scored a goal in a 2010 FIFA World Cup qualifier against Andorra.

International goals
Score and Result lists Belarus' goals first

Honours
Naftan Novopolotsk
Belarusian Cup winner: 2008–09, 2011–12

External links
 
 
 

1986 births
Living people
People from Mogilev
Belarusian footballers
Association football central defenders
Belarus international footballers
Belarusian expatriate footballers
Expatriate footballers in Russia
Expatriate footballers in Poland
Belarusian expatriate sportspeople in Russia
Russian Premier League players
Ekstraklasa players
FC Naftan Novopolotsk players
PFC Krylia Sovetov Samara players
FC Ufa players
Korona Kielce players
FC Neman Grodno players
Sportspeople from Mogilev Region